The Rural Municipality of Argyle No. 1 is a rural municipality (RM) in the Canadian province of Saskatchewan within Census Division No. 1 and  Division No. 1. It is located in the southeast corner of the province along Highway 18.

History 
The RM of Argyle No. 1 incorporated as a rural municipality on December 19, 1912. Prior to it was Local Improvement District No. 1.

The exact derivation of the RM's name is unknown, as numerous Argyles and Argylls exist in Western Canada. Argyle Street in Regina and the Rural Municipality of Argyle in Manitoba were both intended to honour Sir John Campbell, 9th Duke of Argyll and fourth Governor-General of Canada. Why both adopted a more phonetic spelling of the name, most commonly used to refer to a type of knitting pattern, is unknown.

Geography 
The eastern boundary of the RM is the Municipality of Two Borders, in Manitoba. The southern boundary of the RM is the United States border at Renville County and Bottineau County, both in North Dakota.

Communities and localities 
The following urban municipalities are surrounded by the RM.

Villages
 Gainsborough

Demographics 

Government 
The RM of Argyle No. 1 is governed by an elected municipal council and an appointed administrator that meets on the second Tuesday of every month. The reeve of the RM is Allen Henderson while its administrator is Erin McMillen. The RM's office is located in Gainsborough.

Transportation 
Rail
Estevan Section C.P.R—serves Elva, Pierson, Gainsborough, Carievale, Carnduff, Glen Ewen, Oxbow, Rapeard

Roads
Highway 18—serves Gainsborough
Highway 600

See also 
List of rural municipalities in Saskatchewan

References 

A
Division No. 1, Saskatchewan